The 1966 NASCAR Grand National Series evolved into the first of three NASCAR Grand National championships for David Pearson, whose 15 wins through the season was second only to Tim Flock's 18 victories in 1955 at that time.  NASCAR allowed the return of the Chrysler Hemi engine in 1966, and at the same time Ford decided to boycott NASCAR for the season. The season marked series first visit to the state of Maine. Pearson captured the championship with 35,638 points over second place James Hylton who finished the season with no wins, but 33,638 points for his consistency and efforts.

Schedule

Season recap 
The 1966 NASCAR season was affected by Ford's withdrawal of financial support from the series (though teams continued to race Fords), and NASCAR allowing Chrysler drivers to run the Hemi engine.  While Ford's departure had the effect of lowering attendance, the strong Hemi engine coupled with reduced competition meant that Chrysler drivers were particularly successful during the season.  David Pearson in his Dodges took a total of 15 victories, Richard Petty in his Plymouth captured another 8, and Paul Goldsmith, Jim Paschal, Earl Balmer, LeeRoy Yarbrough, Jim Hurtubise, Marvin Panch, Paul Lewis, and Sam McQuagg all reached pole position in MoPar powered equipment.  By the end of the 1966 NASCAR season, Chrysler vehicles drove to victory lane a total of 34 times in 49 events, after winning only six races in the 1965 season.  Pearson, nicknamed "The Silver Fox", won his 15 events in 42 starts that season with a total of 35,638 points over second place Hylton (33,688 points), and 1964 season champion Richard Petty (22,952 points).  While newcomer Hylton was unable to win an event in 1966, his 20 top five finishes, and 32 top ten finishes earned him not only second place in the point standings, but NASCAR Rookie of the Year honors as well.  When the season was concluded Ford won the "NASCAR Manufacturers' Championship" with 1,047 points over Plymouth (633 points) and third place Dodge (632 points).

Mid-size cars would first be implemented for this NASCAR Grand National Cup Series season. Ten years later, the rising price of gas for passenger vehicles caused all car classes to shrink. Automakers moved previously "full-size" nameplates to smaller platforms.

Race summaries 

The 1966 NASCAR season opened at Augusta Speedway on November 14, 1965, with Richard Petty winning the season opening event in a 1965 Plymouth.  NASCAR then ventured to Riverside International Raceway where Dan Gurney took the checkered flag in a 1965 Ford.  After the January 23rd Riverside event, the drivers and teams traveled to Daytona International Speedway in Florida for the 1966 Daytona 500.  Paul Goldsmith and Early Balmer took the qualifying events, while Richard Petty notched his first and only Daytona 500 pole position.  Petty came from two laps down during the competition to win by more than a full lap when the race was halted 2 laps shy of scheduled  event due to thunderstorms.  In March Paul Goldsmith won at Rockingham Speedway, Dick Hutcherson at Bristol, and Jim Hurtubise captured the checkered flag at Atlanta Motor Speedway.  Hutcherson's victory at Bristol was by more than 4 laps over the closest competitor, Paul Lewis, when crashes and attrition left only seven cars of the 38 starters running at the end of the Southeastern 500 (now known as Food City 500).  On April 3, Pearson finally found his way to victory lane in the first of four consecutive victories at Hickory Motor Speedway.  He followed up with wins at Columbia Speedway, Greenville, and Winston-Salem, before Jim Paschal broke his streak at North Wilksboro and repeated at Martinsville Speedway.  On May 7, Richard Petty started a string of three consecutive wins at Darlington Raceway, Hampton, and Macon.  After Ford's announcement of their boycott of NASCAR on April 7, only 2.500 fans attend the May 13th event in which Darel Dieringer captures the win at Monroe in a  contest.

Even though Ford had withdrawn their financial support from NASCAR in April, the series opened June at Spartanburg, S.C. with a resounding domination of the event by Ford vehicles.  The Fords led every lap of the  event, and Elmo Langley found victory lane at the  venue when promoters refused to allow the Chrysler cars to run; because of the Ford boycott.  Pearson then won a  event at Maryville, followed by another Petty victory at Weaverville.  Tiny Lund broke into the winners circle at Beltsville, and Pearson notched another checkered flag at the Greenville in his 1964 Dodge to close out the month of June.

On July 4, 1966 the fans, drivers, and teams returned to Daytona for the Firecracker 400 (now Coke Zero 400), and second year driver Sam McQuagg drove his Dodge  to capture his first NASCAR win.  McQuaggs Dodge Charger was equipped with an aluminum strip attached to the decklid of his car, and the rear spoiler makes its debut in NASCAR racing.  The following weekend NASCAR legend Bobby Allison drives  to victory lane in Oxford, Maine.  The win is Allison's first major NASCAR win, and Chevrolet's first visit to victory circle since October 13, 1963.  Pearson grabbed another win the following week at Fonda Speedway in New York, and Allison captured a second win at Islip NY.  Paul Goldsmith and Paul Lewis garnered wins at Bristol and Maryville respectively, and Richard Petty closed out the month of July with a win at Nashville.

NASCAR started the month of August at the Atlanta International Raceway, but not without controversy. David Pearson was disqualified from the Dixie 400 prior to the start of the race; with the explication that his Dodge was illegal. Fred Lorenzen was allowed to run, even though it was determined that some of the aerodynamic enhancements made to his Junior Johnson Ford were not approved. NASCAR Bill France admitted that the "rules were bent" in order to lure Ford back to competition.  Petty won the event over second-place finisher Buddy Baker, with Wendell Scott taking the seventh-place finish and the highest for the Ford drivers in the  event at the  paved venue in Atlanta.  Pearson returned to the track, and victory lane for the twelfth time in 1966 at the next event on August 18 at Columbia; an event that witnessed driver Curtis Turner finish third while wearing a three-piece business suit as a promotion for his sponsor Holly Farms.  Turner said they: "wanted me to wear a suit, but they didn't specify what kind. So I wore my best."  Darel Dieringer won the next event at Weaverville in his 1966 Mercury, followed by another win by Allison at Beltsville.  Pearson got another victory to finish off the month of August at Winston-Salem.

The first event of September was held at Darlington, and Darel Dieringer roped in the victory in his 1966 Mercury.  Pearson gathered up another two wins at Hickory and Richmond in the following events, followed by Hutcherson's win at Hillsboro on the 18th.  The last September event was held at Martinsville, and the record books show that Lorenzen won the event.  The Martinsville race was noteworthy in its final outcome, due to a controversy once again.  Originally Lorenzen was declared the winner; but, he was disqualified for having a fuel tank larger than the rules permitted.  Three days after the event, NASCAR restored Lorenzen's victory with the justification that the fuel tank was purchased from Firestone, and thus within the spirit of the rules.

The final three events of the 1966 NASCAR season held in October were won by Dick Hutcherson, LeeRoy Yarbrough, and Fred Lorenzen winning the season finale. Hutcherson won at North Wilkesboro, Yarbrough at Charlotte, and Lorenzen took the final victory at Rockingham.  The  Rockingham event was filled with popular drivers, and proved to be the final race for 2 legends of the sport. Both Ned Jarrett, and Junior Johnson made their final appearances as drivers at the event. Jarrett finished third, and Johnson came home in a respectful fifth-place finish on October 30, 1966.

Season statistics

References

See also 

 1966 American 500
 1966 Daytona 500
 1966 Myers Brothers 250
 1966 Nashville 400
 1966 Smoky Mountain 200
 1966 Southern 500

 

NASCAR Cup Series seasons